Martti Miettunen's first cabinet was the 46th government of Republic of Finland. Cabinet's time period was from August 14, 1961 to April 13, 1962. It was Minority government.

Miettunen 1
1961 establishments in Finland
1962 disestablishments in Finland
Cabinets established in 1961
Cabinets disestablished in 1962